Meg Waite Clayton (born January 1, 1959 in Washington, D.C.) is an American novelist.

Biography
A graduate of University of Michigan Law School, Clayton also earned bachelor's degrees in History and Psychology from the University of Michigan. She worked as a lawyer at the Los Angeles firm of Latham & Watkins. She grew up primarily in suburban Kansas City and suburban Chicago, where she graduated from Glenbrook North High School. She began writing in earnest after moving to a horse farm outside of Baltimore, Maryland, where her first novel is set. She now lives in the San Francisco Bay Area.

In addition to her work as a novelist, she has written for the Los Angeles Times, Writer's Digest, Runner's World, and public radio.

Awards and honors
Clayton's first novel, The Language of Light, was a finalist for the 2002 Bellwether Prize for Fiction, now the PEN/Bellwether Prize for Socially Engaged Fiction. Her novel The Wednesday Sisters became a bestseller and a popular book club choice. Her "After the Debate" on Forbes online was praised by the  Columbia Journalism Review as "[t]he absolute best story about women's issues stemming from the second Presidential debate." The Race for Paris was a 2015 Langum Prizes Historical Fiction Honorable Mention.

Bibliography
 The Language of Light (2003)
 The Wednesday Sisters (2007)
 The Four Ms. Bradwells (2011)
 The Race for Paris (2015)
 Beautiful Exiles (2018)
 The Last Train to London (2019)

References

1959 births
Living people
University of Michigan Law School alumni
Writers from Chicago
Novelists from California
Novelists from Kansas
American women novelists
Novelists from Illinois
21st-century American novelists
21st-century American women writers